Alex Bourret (born October 5, 1986) is a Canadian professional ice hockey right winger who most notably played in the American Hockey League (AHL).

Playing career
His first season in the QMJHL was in the 2002–03 season, where he played with the Sherbrooke Castors. The team moved to Lewiston, Maine the following season. He played the next two seasons with the Lewiston Maineiacs, where he led the team in scoring in the second year, and was selected by Maineiacs fans as the team's most popular player. Wishing to play closer to home, Bourret asked for and received a trade, as the Maineiacs dealt him to the Shawinigan Cataractes in exchange for Stefano Giliati. Bourret's impressive offensive production led to being selected in the first round, 16th overall, of the 2005 NHL Entry Draft by the Atlanta Thrashers. In 2005–06, Bourret once again led his team in scoring, with 114 points.

On February 26, 2007, Bourret was traded to the New York Rangers in exchange for Pascal Dupuis and a third-round pick in the 2007 NHL Entry Draft (Robert Bortuzzo). On June 21, 2008, Bourret was traded to the Coyotes for a third-round pick in the 2008 NHL Draft, and after unimpressive work in the AHL was released in September 2009.

On July 7, 2010, after splitting the previous year between Europe and the Las Vegas Wranglers of the ECHL, Bourret signed a one-year deal with High1 of the Asia League Ice Hockey. He left the team in November 2010.

On September 28, 2011, the Wichita Thunder of the then CHL announced they had signed Bourret for the 2011–12 season.

Coaching career
Effectively ending his professional career during his tenure in the Ligue Nord-Américaine de Hockey, Bourret has coached the Marie-Rivier Canimex Espoir
of the QMEAA. Initially joining as an assistant in 2016, Bourret became the head coach the following year.

Career statistics

Regular season and playoffs

International

References

External links

1986 births
Living people
Arlan Kokshetau players
Atlanta Thrashers draft picks
Canadian ice hockey right wingers
Chicago Wolves players
French Quebecers
Hartford Wolf Pack players
High1 players
Ice hockey people from Quebec
HC Kometa Brno players
Las Vegas Wranglers players
Lewiston Maineiacs players
National Hockey League first-round draft picks
Ontario Reign (ECHL) players
San Antonio Rampage players
Shawinigan Cataractes players
Sherbrooke Castors players
Sportspeople from Drummondville
Wichita Thunder players
Worcester Sharks players
Canadian expatriate ice hockey players in the United States
Canadian expatriate ice hockey players in the Czech Republic
Canadian expatriate ice hockey players in South Korea
Canadian expatriate ice hockey players in Kazakhstan